The Flying Dutchman was an event on the 2008 Vintage Yachting Games program at the IJsselmeer, Netherlands. Six out of the seven scheduled race were completed. 28 sailors, on 14 boats, from 10 nations entered.

Venue overview

Race area and Course
Approximately 2 nautical miles of the coast of Medemblik two course areas (orange and yellow) were used for the 2008 edition of the Vintage Yachting Games.

For the 2008 edition of the Vintage Yachting Games four different courses were available. The Flying Dutchman could only use course 3.

Wind conditions 
During the 2008 Vintage Yachting Games the sailors experienced the following weather conditions:

Races

Summary 
In the Flying Dutchman at race area Yellow only six races could be completed.

In the Flying Dutchman it was a massive victory for the team of Szabolcs Majthenyi, at the helm, and Andras Domokos representing Hungary. With only first places!
Silver was for the German team of Kilian Koenig and Johannes Brack. In third place came the second German team of Kai Schäfers and Marcus Landgrebe.

Results 

 dnc = did not compete
 dns = did not start
 dnf = did not finish
 dsq = disqualified
 ocs = on course side
 ret = retired after finish
 Crossed out results did not count for the total result.

Daily standings

Victors

References 

 

Flying Dutchman